The 38th National Basketball Association All-Star Game was played on February 7, 1988, at Chicago Stadium in Chicago. The East won the game 138-133 and Michael Jordan (who scored a game-high 40 points) was named the NBA All-Star Game Most Valuable Player (MVP).

Summary
The Eastern Conference team featured Jordan and Dominique Wilkins, who had faced each other the preceding night in the slam dunk contest, along with Boston Celtics trio Larry Bird, Danny Ainge and Kevin McHale, plus Patrick Ewing of the New York Knicks, Maurice Cheeks and  Charles Barkley of the Philadelphia 76ers, Moses Malone of the Washington Bullets, Isiah Thomas of the Detroit Pistons, Doc Rivers of the Atlanta Hawks, and Brad Daugherty of the Cleveland Cavaliers.

The Western Conference team was led by Magic Johnson of the Los Angeles Lakers, Clyde Drexler of the Portland Trail Blazers, the Utah Jazz's power forward Karl Malone and the Houston Rockets' center Akeem Olajuwon. Joining them were James Worthy and Kareem Abdul-Jabbar of the Lakers, Fat Lever and Alex English of the Denver Nuggets, Xavier McDaniel of the Seattle SuperSonics, Alvin Robertson of the San Antonio Spurs and Mark Aguirre and James Donaldson of the Dallas Mavericks. In this game, Abdul-Jabbar would become the all-time leading scorer in NBA All-Star Game history, a distinction he held for 15 years.

The Eastern Conference was coached by Mike Fratello of the Atlanta Hawks, and the Western Conference by Pat Riley of the Lakers.

The game was telecast by CBS Sports, with Dick Stockton and Billy Cunningham commentating, and Pat O'Brien and Lesley Visser reporting from the sidelines. On radio, ABC Radio broadcast their fourth consecutive All-Star game, with Lakers announcer Chick Hearn working alongside Celtics announcer Johnny Most, and the two trading roles on play-by-play and color analysis. ABC's regular NBA announcer Fred Manfra served as a sideline reporter.

Rosters

Steve Johnson was unable to play due to injury. James Donaldson was selected as his replacement.

Score by periods
 

Halftime: East, 60–54
Third quarter: East, 99–89
Officials: Darell Garretson and Jake O'Donnell
Attendance: 18,403

NBA All-Star Legends Classic
This game featured the East including the likes of Randy Smith, Dave Cowens, Johnny Green, Calvin Murphy, John Havlicek, Gail Goodrich, Jamaal Wilkes, Oscar Robertson, Clifford Ray and Tom Sanders
On the West side it featured the likes of Rick Barry, Doug Collins, Dave Bing, Jerry Sloan, Zelmo Beaty, Bailey Howell, Tom Hawkins, Nate Thurmond, Dolph Schayes and Norm Van Lier.

References

National Basketball Association All-Star Game
All-Star
Basketball competitions in Chicago